Tapsi may refer to:
 TAPSI, Iranian ridesharing company
 Täpsi, village in Estonia